WHKQ is a Contemporary Christian formatted broadcast radio station licensed to Louisa, Kentucky, serving Lawrence and Boyd counties in Kentucky and Wayne County in West Virginia. WHKQ is owned and operated by Expression Production Group, LLC.

History
On October 1, 2016, the then-WZAQ changed their format from adult hits (as "Jack FM") to Educational Media Foundation's "K-Love" contemporary Christian format. The station changed its call sign to the current WHKQ on January 24, 2017.

References

External links

1991 establishments in Kentucky
Contemporary Christian radio stations in the United States
Radio stations established in 1991
HKQ
Louisa, Kentucky